Ectopatria aspera is a moth of the family Noctuidae. It is found in New South Wales, South Australia, Victoria, Western Australia and New Zealand. It is considered a migratory species.

The wingspan is 36–38 mm.

The forewings and thorax are whitish-grey. The hindwings are white with a broad fuscous area round the apex and termen in males and wholly fuscous in females. Males have a dense truncate tuft of hair on the middle tibia.

References

External links

Atlas of Living Australia entry on Ectopatria aspera.

Moths of Australia
Noctuinae
Moths of New Zealand
Moths described in 1857